Nedine longipes is a species of beetle in the family Cerambycidae. It was described by J. Thomson in 1864.

References

Desmiphorini
Beetles described in 1864